April in Portugal may refer to:

"April in Portugal" (song), a popular song, also known as "The Whisp'ring Serenade"
April in Portugal (film), a 1954 film featuring the song